Giro delle Marche in Rosa is a multi-day women's road cycling race held in Italy. The first edition was held in 2019 as a 2.2 category race on the UCI women's road cycling calendar.

Past winners

References 

Cycle races in Italy
Women's road bicycle races
Recurring sporting events established in 2018